The Fringe Dwellers is a 1961 novel written by the Western Australian author Nene Gare. It was made into a 1986 film of the same name directed by Bruce Beresford.

References

Australian novels adapted into films
1961 Australian novels